Zhao Weichang (born 21 April 1950) is a Chinese speed skater from Changchun, Jilin. He competed in three events at the 1980 Winter Olympics. He became the head coach of Jilin Speed Skating Team after the 1980 games.

He was the first torch runner at the opening ceremony of the 2022 Winter Olympics.

References

External links
 

1950 births
Living people
Chinese male speed skaters
Olympic speed skaters of China
Speed skaters at the 1980 Winter Olympics
Speed skaters from Changchun
20th-century Chinese people